Pencuke is a hamlet near Higher Crackington in northeast Cornwall, England, UK.

References

Hamlets in Cornwall